Sir William Blaxland Benham  (29 March 1860 – 21 August 1950) was a New Zealand zoologist.

Biography 
He was born in Isleworth, Middlesex, England, on 29 March 1860. He studied at Marlborough College and London University and taught at Bedford College, London (now part of Royal Holloway, University of London) before moving to New Zealand in 1898. He was a member of the 1907 Sub-Antarctic Islands Scientific Expedition. From 1905 to 1911 he was the Governor in Council of the Board of Governors of the New Zealand Institute.

Benham was professor of biology at the University of Otago from 1898 until he retired and was given the title of professor emeritus in 1937. In 1937, he was awarded the King George VI Coronation Medal, and he was appointed a Knight Commander of the Order of the British Empire in the 1939 King's Birthday Honours. He won the Hutton Medal of the New Zealand Institute in 1911, and the Hector Medal in 1935. In 1942, he was awarded an honorary Doctor of Science degree by the University of New Zealand.

Benham died in Dunedin on 21 August 1950, and his ashes were buried in Dunedin Northern Cemetery.

Selected publications

References

External links

1860 births
1950 deaths
New Zealand Fellows of the Royal Society
English emigrants to New Zealand
New Zealand Knights Commander of the Order of the British Empire
20th-century New Zealand zoologists
20th-century New Zealand scientists
Presidents of the Royal Society of New Zealand
People associated with Otago Museum
Academic staff of the University of Otago
Burials at Dunedin Northern Cemetery